Barbara K. Whinnery (born July 1, 1953) is an American actress from Berkeley, California, best known for the role of Dr. Cathy Martin on the television drama St. Elsewhere. She has made guest appearances in several other television shows and has also appeared in movies and on stage.

She trained at the Actor's Conservatory Theater in San Francisco (where her classmates included her future St. Elsewhere co-stars Denzel Washington and Cynthia Sikes ), and with Milton Katselas. She currently is a studio faculty member at The Acting Place in Los Angeles, California.

Filmography

Film

Television

External links 

The Acting Place acting school

Living people
1953 births
Actresses from Berkeley, California
20th-century American actresses
21st-century American women